Yoga tourism is travel with the specific purpose of experiencing some form of yoga, whether spiritual or postural. The former is a type of spiritual tourism; the latter is related both to spiritual and to wellness tourism. Yoga tourists often visit ashrams in India to study yoga or to be trained and certified as yoga teachers. Major centres for yoga tourism include Rishikesh and Mysore. 

While the Himalayas is the birthplace of yoga and a major yoga tourism destination, yoga retreats and holidays are provided in many countries, varying from simple stays in guesthouses and ashrams to 5-star comfort in luxury resorts.

Venues

Yoga tourism does not necessarily mean travel to an ashram (a Hindu monastery), nor necessarily to India, though as the birthplace of yoga it is the activity's locus classicus. Ashrams offering yoga exist, for example, in Canada. Other possible types of venue describe themselves as "holistic centres" and "yoga holidays", including holidays at "a 5-star resort with a celebrity Yoga Teacher". Yoga holidays are provided in countries including Greece, Sri Lanka, Japan, Thailand, Scotland, France, Morocco, England, Portugal, Spain, Turkey, the Maldives and Wales. Yoga retreats can be found in many countries, including for instance Costa Rica and Italy. Hotels and guesthouses around the world similarly offer yoga holidays in countries such as Bulgaria and Turkey; "pastoral yoga" can be found in countries including France.

India

India has become a major destination for yoga tourism, following on from Sri Swami Sivananda Saraswati Maharaj's arrival in Rishikesh in 1922 to promote his philosophy of yoga. Then an English rock band the Beatles travelled to Rishikesh in 1968 to take part in a Transcendental Meditation training course at Maharishi Mahesh Yogi's ashram. The visit sparked widespread Western interest in Indian spirituality, and has led many Westerners to travel to India hoping to find "authentic" yoga in ashrams in places such as Mysore (for Ashtanga Yoga) and Rishikesh. That movement led in turn to the creation of many yoga schools offering teacher training and promotion of India as a "yoga tourism hub" by the Indian Ministry of Tourism and the Ministry of AYUSH.

Reception

Youthful Westerners' sometimes naive spiritual quests to India, and the many varieties of ashram and yoga on offer to them, are gently satirised in the Mindful Yoga instructor Anne Cushman's novel Enlightenment for Idiots.

Elizabeth Gilbert's 2006 memoir Eat, Pray, Love, now also a romantic Hollywood film, describes her experiences in an Indian ashram on her journey of self-discovery. Gilbert is thought to have stayed in the Siddha Yoga ashram Gurudev Siddha Peeth in Maharashtra; the film's "Pray" section was set in Ashram Hari Mandir at Pataudi, near Delhi.

See also 
 Medical tourism
 Wellness tourism

References 

Yoga as exercise
Yoga training and certification
Types of tourism